Nicola "Nicky" Smith (born 15 February 1980) is an association football player who represented New Zealand.

Smith made her Football Ferns as a substitute in a 1–4 loss to Germany on 26 May 1998, and finished her international career with 23 caps and 24 goals to her credit.

References

External links

1980 births
Living people
New Zealand women's international footballers
New Zealand women's association footballers
Women's association footballers not categorized by position